The 2001 Lincolnshire County Council election was held on Thursday, 7 June 2001, the same day as the general election. Boundary changes to the electoral divisions of the county took effect at this election, with the number of seats increased by 1. The whole council of 77 members was up for election and the election resulted in the Conservative Party retaining control of the council, winning 49 seats.

Results by division
Each electoral division returned one county councillor. The candidate elected to the council in each electoral division is shown in the table below. "Unopposed" indicates that the councillor was elected unopposed.

References

2001
2001 English local elections
June 2001 events in the United Kingdom
2000s in Lincolnshire